Velyadi (also, Velyady) is a village in the Lankaran Rayon of Azerbaijan.  The village forms part of the municipality of Gərmətük.

References 

Populated places in Lankaran District